Austol was a 6th-century Cornish holy man who lived much of his life in Brittany.

He was a friend of Méen, who founded the Saint-Méen Abbey in Brittany. Méen is said to have been his godfather. The parish and town of St Austell in Cornwall is named in his honour. He is regarded as a saint and is honoured with a Breton feast day on 28 June and a Cornish feast day on the Thursday of Whitsun. According to tradition, Austol died within a week after the death of Méen. Before the Reformation, the parishes of St Austell and St Mewan celebrated together because of the friendship between the two saints.

In popular culture 
This article was the topic of conversation in the second episode of series three of the web series "Two Of These People Are Lying" hosted by The Technical Difficulties.

References

Sources
Attwater, Donald & John, Catherine Rachel (1993) The Penguin Dictionary of Saints. 3rd edition. New York: Penguin Books .
Doble, G. H. (1970) The Saints of Cornwall: part 5. Truro: Dean and Chapter; pp. 35–58

5th-century births
6th-century deaths
Medieval Breton saints
6th-century Christian saints
Medieval Cornish saints
6th-century Breton people